Josiah Johnston Preston (June 7, 1855 – July 10, 1937) was an Ontario merchant and political figure. He represented Durham East in the Legislative Assembly of Ontario from 1902 to 1919 as a Conservative member.

He was born in Manvers Township, Durham County, the son of James Preston. Preston was a grain dealer. He served as reeve for Manvers and was also warden for the United Counties of Northumberland and Durham in 1897. He became clerk for the township in 1898. He was defeated in the 1919 election. Preston was a member of the Orange Order and a freemason.

References 
 Canadian Parliamentary Guide, 1901, AJ Magurn

External links 
Member's parliamentary history for the Legislative Assembly of Ontario
Josiah Preston - Biography - Trent University Archives

1855 births
1937 deaths
Progressive Conservative Party of Ontario MPPs